PennPraxis is the clinical arm of the School of Design at the University of Pennsylvania, and is a 501c(3) non-profit subsidiary of the Trustees of the University of Pennsylvania. The group offers community collaborative design opportunities for Penn faculty and students to test ideas and theories in practical real-world applications. Also offered are architectural and planning services to individuals and groups who are either in need or are otherwise unable to procure these services from traditional sources. In its first ten years, it earned $16m in fees.

About the project 
Requirements for project proposals are that the projects do not meet the university's guidelines for "sponsored research projects"; they must also provide educational benefits and/or serve the interests of the (Philadelphia) community. PennPraxis has been working on ideas for urban planning for the city of Philadelphia, Pennsylvania according to a 'civic vision' it has for the city, including the Delaware River waterfront, and the western banks of the Schuylkill River, where Penn's campus faces. The group is led by executive director and Penn faculty member Harris Steinberg. Some of the group's funding comes from the William Penn Foundation.

PlanPhilly, or www.PlanPhilly.com, is the group's independent news website, covering the city's Planning Commission, the Zoning Board of Adjustment, the Zoning Code Commission, the Delaware River Waterfront Corp. (formerly Penn's Landing Corp.), development, housing, streets, commercial real estate and other, related topics. Its editor is Matt Golas, formerly of the Philadelphia Inquirer. The main writers for the site are Kellie Patrick Gates and business writer Thomas J. Walsh.

History 
On June 26, 2008, Philadelphia mayor Michael Nutter accepted PennPraxis' recommendations for the introduction of Foxwoods and SugarHouse casinos in the redevelopment of the Delaware River waterfront. The plan, while not binding on the two casino operators yet, strongly recommends serious redesign of the casinos' plans, including the use of off-site parking accessible to non-patrons. Representatives from both casinos accused PennPraxis of being biased against them. It was later reported that PennPraxis hired five experts to devise alternative plans for the casinos, accommodating for reduced on-site parking, a breakdown from a more singular building mass to allow more public access to the river, a 30-percent allotment of the area for open space, use of green roofs and accommodations for mass transit, to conform to PennPraxis' civic vision, parts of which the mayor has since promised to accept.

Designs by PennPraxis influenced plans for the regeneration of Philadelphia's waterfront announced in 2012.

References

External links
PennPraxis official website
PlanPhilly.com - independent reporting arm for PennPraxis
Philadelphia City Planning Commission
Philadelphia Zoning Code Commission
Delaware Valley Regional Planning Commission (DVRPC)

Architectural education